Suppression may refer to:

Laws
 Suppression of Communism Act
Suppression order a type of censorship where a court rules that certain information cannot be published
 Tohunga Suppression Act 1907, an Act of the Parliament of New Zealand aimed to replace tohunga as traditional Māori healers with "modern" medicine

Mathematics and science

Biology, psychology and healthcare 
 Suppression (eye), of an eye is a subconscious adaptation by a person's brain to eliminate the symptoms of disorders of binocular vision such as strabismus, convergence insufficiency and aniseikonia
 Appetite suppression
 Bone marrow suppression, the decrease in cells responsible for providing immunity, carrying oxygen, and those responsible for normal blood clotting
 Cough medicine, which may contain a cough suppressant, a medicinal drug used in an attempt to treat coughing
 Expressive suppression, a psychological aspect of emotion regulation
 Flash suppression, a phenomenon of visual perception in which an image presented to one eye is suppressed by a flash of another image presented to the other eye
 Genetic suppression
 Reflux suppressant, in medicine
 Suppression subtractive hybridization, in biochemistry
 Thought suppression, the psychological process of deliberately trying to stop thinking about certain thoughts, associated with obsessive-compulsive disorder

Other uses in mathematics and science 
 Compton suppression, in nuclear physics

 Zero suppression, in mathematics and information theory

Politics 
 Censorship, the suppression of public communication considered objectionable to the general body of people as determined by a government or media outlet
 Suppression of dissent, occurs when an individual or group tries to censor, persecute or otherwise oppress the other party rather than communicate logically
 Suppression of evidence, the act of preventing evidence from being shown in a trial
 Voter suppression, a strategy to influence the outcome of an election by discouraging or preventing people from exercising their right to vote
 Catch and kill, buying exclusive publication rights to an individual's story, and then suppressing the information

Religion 
 Suppression (parish), the forced closure of a Catholic parish or association
 Religious intolerance, or religious suppression, intolerance against another's religious beliefs or practices by individuals, private groups, government agencies or the whole government
 Suppressive Person, a Church of Scientology concept discussed in the book, The Cause of Suppression

Technology 
 Electromagnetic interference suppression, e.g., of electrical noise from switches and motors
 Fire suppression system
 Firefighting, involves the suppression of fire
 Free energy suppression and other suppressed technology
 Silence suppression, in telephony
 Transient-voltage-suppression diode, an electronic component used to protect sensitive electronics from voltage spikes induced on connected wires

Weapons 
 Suppressive fire, weapons fire that degrades the performance of a target below the level needed to fulfill its mission
 Suppressor, a device attached to or part of the barrel of a firearm which reduces the amount of noise and flash generated by firing the weapon

Other uses
 Suppressed correlative, a logical fallacy